Maria Judith Zuzarte Cortesão (31 December 1914 – 25 September 2007) was a  climatologist, geneticist and psychologist. In 2003, she was awarded the Ordem do Mérito Cultural.

Life 
In 1940, she went into exile in Brazil, with her family. She was a professor at Federal University of Rio Grande.

Family 
She was the daughter of the historian Jaime Zuzarte Cortesão. She married Agostinho da Silva. They had eight children.

Further reading 

 Vania da Costa Machado, "A trajetória de vida de Judith Cortesão através de seu arquivo pessoal", Conexões Culturais, v2 n1 (2016): 185-197

Works 
 Mata atlântica,  Editora Index : Fundação S.O.S. Mata Atlântica, 1991.
 Juréia : a luta pela vida [São Paulo] Ed. Index 1989.

References 

1914 births
2007 deaths
Climatologists
Brazilian geneticists
Recipients of the Order of Cultural Merit (Brazil)
Portuguese psychologists
Portuguese women psychologists
Women geneticists
20th-century psychologists